Clemmons is a village in Forsyth County, North Carolina, United States and a suburb of Winston-Salem. The population was 21,177 at the 2020 census, with an estimated population of 21,517 in 2021.

Geography
Clemmons is located in southwestern Forsyth County at  (36.025232, -80.386413). It is bordered to the northeast by the city of Winston-Salem, to the north by the town of Lewisville, and to the southwest, across the Yadkin River, by the town of Bermuda Run in Davie County.

Interstate 40 passes through the village, with access from Exits 182 and 184.

Demographics

2020 census

As of the 2020 United States census, there were 21,163 people, 7,733 households, and 5,400 families residing in the village.

2000 census
As of the census of 2000, there were 13,827 people, 5,291 households, and 3,947 families residing in the village. The population density was 1,291.2 people per square mile (498.5/km2). There were 5,614 housing units at an average density of 524.2 per square mile (202.4/km2). The racial makeup of the village was 89.87% White, 5.21% African American, 0.09% Native American, 2.10% Asian, 0.02% Pacific Islander, 1.76% from other races, and 0.95% from two or more races. Hispanic or Latino of any race were 3.54% of the population.

There were 5,291 households, out of which 36.3% had children under the age of 18 living with them, 64.5% were married couples living together, 7.7% had a female householder with no husband present, and 25.4% were non-families. 5.6% of households had someone living alone who was 65 years of age or older. The average household size was 2.56 and the average family size was 2.97.

In the village, the population was spread out, with 25.7% under the age of 18, 6.1% from 18 to 24, 30.6% from 25 to 44, 26.0% from 45 to 64, and 11.7% who were 65 years of age or older. The median age was 38 years. For every 100 females, there were 92.7 males. For every 100 females age 18 and over, there were 90.0 males.

The median income for a household in the village was $60,486, and the median income for a family was $70,029. Males had a median income of $49,892 versus $32,558 for females. The per capita income for the village was $27,679. About 2.8% of families and 3.5% of the population were below the poverty line, including 3.6% of those under age 18 and 8.5% of those age 65 or over.

Village facts

 Originally called Clemmonsville, the Village of Clemmons was founded in 1802 and incorporated in 1986.
 Clemmons is located in the Northwestern Piedmont section of North Carolina in Forsyth County.
 Clemmons is ten miles (16 km) southwest of Winston-Salem, a city of approximately 244,605
 Clemmons, population 20,420, is part of the "Piedmont Triad" and the Winston-Salem Metropolitan Statistical Area.
 The proximity of Clemmons to this major urban center and its location along Interstate 40 has contributed to the growth of the Village.
 Clemmons encompasses .
 West Forsyth High School, the largest high school in Forsyth County, is located in Clemmons.
 The Village of Clemmons operates under the Council/Manager form of government. Policy and legislative authority rest with an elected Council which is composed of a Mayor and five Council members. The Mayor and one Council member are elected for a two-year term with the remainder of the Council elected to four-year terms. Currently, the Mayor is Michael Rogers and Council members are Michelle Barson, Bradley Taylor, Mary Cameron, Mike Combest, and Chris Wrights.
 The Village Council, among other responsibilities, passes ordinances, adopts an annual budget, appoints citizens to boards and committees, and hires a Village Manager. The Village Manager is responsible for the implementation of the council's policies and ordinances, supervision of the Village employees, and overall maintenance of the day-to-day operations of the Village.
 The tax rate for the Village of Clemmons is .115 cents per $100 of property tax value.
 The Clemmons Little League baseball team made the 2002 Little League World Series as the Southeast team before losing in the pool play stage. A notable player on the team was 2011 NASCAR Camping World Truck Series and 2013 NASCAR Nationwide Series champion Austin Dillon.

Points of interest
 Tanglewood Park
 Tanglewood Park Arboretum and Rose Garden
 Tanglewood Park's Festival of Lights (seasonal)
 Village Point Greenway and Fishing Pier
 Tanglewood BMX
 Southwest Athletics

References

External links
 Village of Clemmons official website
 Clemmons Courier, community news

Villages in North Carolina
Villages in Forsyth County, North Carolina
Populated places established in 1802